Xapuri River is a river of Acre state in western Brazil. It forms small parts of the Brazil–Peru and Brazil–Bolivia international boundaries.

The river runs through the  Chico Mendes Extractive Reserve, a sustainable use environmental unit created in 1990.
It joins the Acre River at Xapuri.

See also
List of rivers of Acre

References

Brazilian Ministry of Transport

Rivers of Acre (state)
Rivers of Peru
Rivers of Bolivia
Brazil–Peru border
Bolivia–Brazil border
International rivers of South America